The Socotra bunting (Emberiza socotrana) is a species of bird in the family Emberizidae.

It is endemic to Yemen, where its natural habitat is subtropical or tropical high-altitude shrubland. It is threatened by habitat loss.

Gallery

References

Socotra bunting
Endemic birds of Socotra
Socotra bunting
Taxonomy articles created by Polbot